The McLaren MP4/5, and its derived sister model, the McLaren MP4/5B, were highly successful Formula One racing cars designed by the McLaren Formula One team based in Woking, England, and powered by Honda's naturally-aspirated RA109E and RA100E V10 engines respectively. The chassis design was led by Neil Oatley, teaming up with Steve Nichols, Pete Weismann, Tim Wright, Bob Bell and Mike Gascoyne. As with the previous designs, Gordon Murray, as Technical Director, had the role of liaising between the drawing office and production. Osamu Goto was the Honda F1 team chief designer for the car's engine.

The MP4/5 was loosely based on its  predecessor, the all-conquering MP4/4.

1989: MP4/5

1989 was the first year where naturally aspirated engines were compulsory for all teams after the banning of the turbocharged units at the end of the previous season. To this end, Honda built a 3.5-litre V10 engine, developed throughout most of the latter half of 1987 and through 1988. The MP4/5 was unveiled for pre-season testing and it was instantly on the pace, as well as reliable. Developed by Neil Oatley, the MP4/5 looked like the car to beat in the new season. While the Ferrari that season was a fast all-around car particularly in the hands of Nigel Mansell, it was also chronically unreliable due to its new semi-electronic gearbox shift, giving a further advantage to McLaren. The Honda-powered MP4/5 proved to have the outright pace over the rest of the field, with fifteen pole positions, thirteen of them by Senna which equaled his 1988 record in the MP4/4. At the Mexican Grand Prix, Senna scored his 34th career pole in the MP4/5, breaking the previous record of 33 held by the late Jim Clark that had stood since .

McLaren took ten victories during the season, six for Ayrton Senna and four for Prost. This was at a time when the relationship between the two men was at its breaking point, so their rivalry pushed the development of the car far ahead of the other teams as they tried to out-do each other (although theirs was a very public rivalry, both actually worked well together in testing and Prost believed neither held back any information). Although Senna won six races to Prost's four and usually finished ahead of the Frenchman in the races, accidents and car breakages meant that he had four fewer points-scoring finishes and finished 16 points behind his French rival in the championship. Senna and Prost's combined points total meant McLaren easily won their second straight Constructors' Championship. A version that had a transversely-mounted gearbox made its debut at the British Grand Prix, with Prost taking victory however Senna went off at Becketts while struggling with the gearbox in his car.

Like 1988, the Drivers' Championship was a two-horse race between defending champion Senna and dual champion Prost. The championship was settled at the penultimate race in Japan. After dominating qualifying (with Senna predictably on pole), the two McLarens were evenly matched in the race and simply drove away from the rest of the field until their fateful collision at the chicane on lap 46. Prost was out on the spot while Senna was able to restart and after pitting for a new nose section, re-took the lead from the Benetton-Ford of Alessandro Nannini and went on to win the race. Ultimately, however, he was disqualified post-race for receiving a push start and missing the chicane after restarting which gave Prost his 3rd World Championship.

1990: MP4/5B

Prost went on to move to Ferrari for the 1990 season, as announced during the midseason of the previous year, taking designer Steve Nichols with him. The Frenchman was unhappy because he believed that McLaren and Honda were favouring Senna.

As a result, Ferrari and McLaren swapped car numbers, giving Prost and teammate Nigel Mansell the numbers 1 and 2, and giving Senna and Gerhard Berger, who had swapped with Prost at Ferrari, the numbers 27 and 28.

For the 1990 version of the car, designated MP4/5B, Oatley and his team redesigned the front and rear wings, and reprofiled the rear bodywork around larger radiators, and several all-new venturi tunnels were put on the rear floor of the car. The engine was tweaked by Honda, and Senna did much development work to ensure he would have better reliability in the new season. He and Gerhard Berger took the fight to Prost and Ferrari in 1990, winning another six races and winning the Constructors' Championship. The McLaren proved to have an outright speed advantage in qualifying and was notable for the number of times both cars were on the front row. The car appeared to struggle slightly against the Ferrari 641s in the races themselves, particularly on heavy fuel loads with the Ferraris' race pace almost negating the McLarens' qualifying supremacy.

It was in that year's race at the Japanese Grand Prix when Senna and Prost collided in the first corner of the first lap, giving Senna the championship due to Prost being unable to continue.

Gordon Murray, the famed South African designer who had previously worked at Brabham since 1969, had designed championship-winning cars for the team and joined McLaren in 1987, retired from Formula One after his work on this car. He went to work on McLaren's road car project.

There was a test mule during the 1990 season created by McLaren called MP4/5C for Honda's new V12 engine that was to be used by the Woking outfit for the following two seasons. This car, driven by the team's test driver Allan McNish, made its public on-track debut at a 3-day test session held at Silverstone the week before the 1990 French Grand Prix. While McNish did not push the car to its limits, the V12 impressed with its reliability at such an early stage of development.

In popular culture
Senna's MP4/5B was included in the 2001 video game Gran Turismo 3 under the alias "F090/S", but only in the Japanese and American versions. It was the least powerful F1 car in the game producing 700 PS (690 hp). It could be won by winning the Super Speedway endurance, the Grand Valley 300 km Endurance, the Dream Car Championship in Professional league, or by winning Formula GT. It is a random prize car in all four series.

The McLaren MP4/5B was featured in the Codemasters video game F1 2019 as downloadable content for the "Legends Edition".

Complete Formula One results
(key) (results shown in bold indicate pole position; results in italics indicate fastest lap)

References

McLaren MP4 05
Formula One championship-winning cars